Future Medicinal Chemistry is a peer-reviewed medical journal covering all aspects of medicinal chemistry, including drug discovery, pharmacology, in silico drug design, structural characterization techniques, ADME-Tox investigations, and science policy, economic and intellectual property issues. It was established in 2009 and is published by Future Science. The editors-in-chief are Iwao Ojima (The State University of New York at Stony Brook) and Jonathan Baell (Monash University).

Abstracting and indexing 
The journal is abstracted and indexed by BIOSIS Previews, Chemical Abstracts, Chemistry Citation Index, Embase/Excerpta Medica,  Index Medicus/MEDLINE/PubMed, Science Citation Index Expanded, and Scopus. According to the Journal Citation Reports, the journal has a 2020 impact factor of 3.808.

References

External links 
 

Chemistry journals
English-language journals
Medicinal chemistry journals
Publications established in 2009
Future Science Group academic journals